Bắc Hà is a township and capital of Bắc Hà District, Lào Cai Province, Vietnam.

References

Populated places in Lào Cai province
District capitals in Vietnam
Townships in Vietnam